Peter Tobaben (July 1, 1905 – December 17, 1972) was a German politician of the Christian Democratic Union (CDU) and former member of the German Bundestag.

Life 
Tobaben was a member of the German Bundestag during its first legislative period (1949-1953) and again from 1957 to 1972. From 6 May 1955 to 31 October 1957 he was a member of the Lower Saxony state parliament. He was originally elected to the DP and became a CDU member on 3 May 1961. Tobaben entered the Bundestag in 1949 via the Lower Saxony state list and from 1957 as a directly elected member of parliament for the Stade - Bremervörde constituency and from 1965 for the Stade constituency.

Literature

References

1905 births
1972 deaths
Members of the Bundestag for Lower Saxony
Members of the Bundestag 1969–1972
Members of the Bundestag 1965–1969
Members of the Bundestag 1961–1965
Members of the Bundestag 1957–1961
Members of the Bundestag 1949–1953
Members of the Bundestag for the Christian Democratic Union of Germany
Members of the Landtag of Lower Saxony